The following is a list of notable people who are associated or born within the area known as the Wirral Peninsula.

A
Nigel Adkins (born 1965), Hull City FC manager
Freya Anderson (born 2001), Olympic gold medal swimmer
Ian Astbury (born 1962), lead vocalist, The Cult
Sallie Axl (Big Brother contestant)

B
Shirley Ballas (born 1960), ballroom dancer & TV personality
Elizabeth Berrington (born 1970), actress
Chris Boardman (born 1968), cyclist
The Boo Radleys, pop group
Ian Botham (born 1955), cricketer
Adrian Boult (1889–1983), conductor
John Bowe (born 1950), actor
Jim Bowen (1937–2018), comedian & TV personality
Paul Bracewell (born 1962), footballer
Peter Bromley (1929–2003), Sports broadcaster
Fiona Bruce (born 1964), TV presenter
Pete Burns (1959–2016), singer/songwriter
William John Burton (1908–1985), draftsman, archer & rifleman

C
Cathy Cassidy (children's author)
Jimmy Cauty (musician, artist, one half of The KLF)
Alan Clarke (film director)
Lewis Collins (actor, The Professionals)
The Coral (indie folk/rock band)
Elvis Costello (singer/songwriter - lived in Birkenhead)
Alex Cox (filmmaker and author)
Daniel Craig (actor, born in neighbouring Chester but grew up on the Wirral)

D
Peter Davenport (footballer)
 Dickie Davies (presenter)
Matt Dawson (rugby player and TV personality)
Dixie Dean (footballer)
Mike Dean (football referee)
Louise Delamere (actor)
Lottie Dod (Wimbledon tennis champion)
Robbie Davies (Olympic boxer)

E
Taron Egerton (actor)
Engine (boogie-rock band, active 1979-1997)
Arthur Charles Evans CBE (author, ex-PoW and ex-General Secretary of the Police Federation)
Lee Latchford Evans (actor and singer with pop group Steps)

F
Michael Farnworth (British Columbia politician born in Bromborough)
Jenny Frost (TV presenter and singer with Atomic Kitten)
Robbie Fowler (Footballer)

G
John Gorman (singer with The Scaffold, presenter on Tiswas)
Roger Lancelyn Green (children's writer; lived at Poulton Hall in Poulton Lancelyn, Bebington)
Wilfred Grenfell ("Grenfell of Labrador")
Miro Griffiths (academic and activist)

H
Half Man Half Biscuit (Alternative satirical group)
Tony Hall (Baron Hall of Birkenhead; former Director-General of the BBC)
Emma Hamilton (mistress of Horatio Nelson)
Austin Healey (rugby player)
Paul Heaton (singer and songwriter for the Beautiful South)
Adrian Henri (poet and artist)
Dave Hickson (footballer)
Paul Hollywood (baker and TV  judge)
Malcolm Holmes (musician)
Barry Horne (footballer) (ex-Everton and Wales footballer and captain)
Stephen Hough (pianist)
Geoffrey Howe (Deputy Prime Minister, Chancellor of the Exchequer and Foreign Secretary (N.B. Associated through service as MP for Bebington)
Geoffrey Hughes (actor)
Shirley Hughes (children's author and illustrator)
Paul Humphreys (musician)
Rita Hunter (Wagnerian soprano)
James Hype (DJ, Producer)

I
Andrew Irvine (Everest climber)
Eric Idle (member of Monty Python; lived in Wallasey as a child)

J
Glenda Jackson (actress and politician)
Megs Jenkins (actress)

K
Miles Kane (musician)

L
Charlie Landsborough (singer/songwriter)
Mark Leckey (Turner Prize-winning artist)
Saunders Lewis (politician, playwright, poet and literary critic)
Phil Liggett (cycling commentator)
Craig Lindfield (professional football player)
Selwyn Lloyd (Conservative Party Secretary of State for Foreign and Commonwealth Affairs and Chancellor of the Exchequer)
Jackie Lomax (singer-songwriter)
Malcolm Lowry (writer)
Nigel Lythgoe (producer and TV personality, best known for being a judge on Popstars)

M
Justin Madders (MP for Ellesmere Port and Neston)
Valerie Masterson (opera singer)
Jason McAteer (footballer)
Andy McCluskey (musician, member of OMD)
Mike McGear (photographer, musician, member of The Scaffold, brother of Paul McCartney)
Alison McGovern (MP for Wirral South)

N
Paul Nowak (trade union leader)
Sally Nugent (BBC journalist & presenter)

O
Oceanic (band)
Paul O'Grady (comedian and TV personality)
Orchestral Manoeuvres in the Dark (electronic band)
Wilfred Owen (one of the greatest poets of the First World War; grew up in Tranmere)

P
Tom Palin (painter)
John Peel (disc jockey and radio presenter)
Vasily Petrenko, (conductor)
Dom Phillips (journalist)
Dominic Purcell (actor)

R
The Rascals (indie band)
Jan Ravens (actress and impressionist)
Simon Rimmer (celebrity chef)
Kate Robbins (impressionist)
Ted Robbins (comedian)
Alan Rouse (climber)
Patricia Routledge (actress)
Maude Royden (suffragist and preacher)
Mike Rutherford (guitarist with Genesis; went to boarding school in Hoylake)
Bill Ryder-Jones (musician from West Kirby)

S
Joanna Scanlan (actor)
Cyril Scott (composer)
The Seal Cub Clubbing Club (post-punk band)
Lucy Sibbick (Oscar Winner)
FE Smith (Lord Chancellor)
Matthew Smith (80s computer game programmer)
Jay Spearing (footballer) 
Olaf Stapledon (writer; spent much of his life in West Kirby and Caldy, and many landscapes mentioned in his works can be identified)
Ralph Steadman (artist)
Philip Wilson Steer (impressionist painter)
Ray Stubbs (sports commentator)

T
Jodie Taylor (footballer, born 1986)
David Thompson (footballer)
Bill Tidy (cartoonist)
Philip Toosey (hero of the real Bridge on the River Kwai incident)

U
The Undertakers, 1960s beat group most of whose members were from the Wirral

V
 Graham Vick (opera director and producer)

W
Jonathan Walters (Stoke City F.C. striker)
William Henry Webster (Church of England vicar and malacologist)
Andreas Whittam-Smith (founder of the Independent)
Cliff Williams (bassist for AC/DC)
Marty Willson-Piper (guitarist for The Church)
Harold Wilson (Prime Minister - Head Boy of Wirral Grammar School)
Steve Wilson (BBC football commentator)
Tim Wright (computer games composer)

See also
List of people from Merseyside

References

 
People from Cheshire West and Chester
Wirral